Tenet (stylized in all caps) is a heavy metal band formed as a side project by Jed Simon of Strapping Young Lad and Zimmers Hole.

Background
Tenet was formed by Jed Simon in the summer of 1996. Together with Steve Wheeler (Zimmers Hole drummer at the time), they started getting Simon's ideas down to demo-tape form, but while both continued playing with their respective bands, nothing much happened for Tenet apart from some casual jam-sessions, which among others also included musicians like Stu Carruthers (Grip Inc.) Simon had met guitarist Glen Alvelais (ex-Forbidden) in 1997 when Strapping Young Lad was touring with Testament, with whom Alvelais was playing at the time. After becoming friends, Simon asked Alvelais to join Tenet.

After signing a deal with Century Media Records, Simon began working on Sovereign with bassist Byron Stroud (Fear Factory, Strapping Young Lad, Zimmers Hole) as well as drummer Adrian Erlandsson (At The Gates, The Haunted, Cradle of Filth, Paradise Lost, Brujeria). After reviewing the fact that not enough attention could be devoted to the project by Erlandsson, due to the large geographical distance and other pending commitments, Simon turned back to his long-time partner Gene Hoglan (Death, Dark Angel, Strapping Young Lad, Testament), to take care of the final drum duties. Tenet was still looking for a vocalist, though after a few auditions, Steve "Zetro" Souza (Legacy/Exodus) was selected for the album. It was mixed by Simon together with Vincent Wojno, and mastered by Andy Sneap.

Sovereign (2009)
After many years of delays and setbacks, Tenet finally released their debut album Sovereign on 20 July 2009 in Europe (11 August 2009 in the United States).

Discography
 Sovereign (2009)

Band members
Current members
 Jed Simon - guitars
 Glen Alvelais - guitars
 Byron Stroud - bass
 Gene Hoglan - drums
 Steve Souza - vocals

Former members
 Adrian Erlandsson - drums
 Stuart Carruthers - bass
 Rob Urbinati - vocals
 Steve Wheeler - drums

References

External links
 Official Myspace page

Canadian thrash metal musical groups
Canadian death metal musical groups
Musical groups established in 1996